The Voice of Germany (season 5) is a German reality talent show that premiered on 15 October 2015 on ProSieben and Sat.1. Based on the reality singing competition The Voice of Holland, the series was created by Dutch television producer John de Mol. It is part of an international series.  Stefanie Kloß Rea Garvey and Michi & Smudo returned as coaches for season 5. while Andreas Bourani was a new coach for season 5. Thore Schölermann Returned as Host for season 5. Lena Gercke was the co host. The season was won by Jamie-Lee Kriewitz, who had already performed The Hanging Tree, which was her song at the blind auditions,  for Jennifer Lawrence at The Hunger Games: Mockingjay – Part 2 premiere in Berlin. At age 17, Kriewitz became the youngest winner in the show's history. Michi & Smudo also achieved their second win as a coach, making them the first, and so far only, coaches to win multiple consecutive seasons.

The Blind Auditions
The castings for the fifth season took place in February and March 2015, but were not shown on television. The Blind Auditions were recorded at the Studio Adlershof in Berlin from July 6 to 9, 2015 and were broadcast on eight television programs from October 15 to November 6, 2015. The jury selected 68 candidates, including four duos and two trios. Each team was filled with 17 participants.

The Battles
The Battle Round was recorded on 1 and 2 September 2015 in Berlin and broadcast from 12 to 20 November 2015 in four episodes. Within each team, the 17 candidates were divided into seven one-on-one duels and a triple battle. The respective coach chose one of the Battle participants as the winner and came directly into the Knockout. As seen in the third and fourth season, the losing candidates could have the chance to be stolen by another coaches. All four coaches each took two candidates from the triple battle, so after the Battles, ten participants per team went into the Knockout.

Color key:

Final

Contestants who appeared on previous season
 Dany Fernandez Peralta & Steve vom Wege participated (separately) in last season, but no one coach  turned for them.

External links
 Official website on ProSieben.de
 The Voice of Germany on fernsehserien.de

2015 German television seasons
5